Campanula rapunculoides, known by the common names creeping bellflower, rampion bellflower, rover bellflower, garden bluebell, creeping bluebell, purple bell, garden harebell, and creeping campanula, is a perennial herbaceous plant of the genus Campanula, belonging to the family Campanulaceae. Native to central and southern Europe and west Asia,. in some parts of North America it is an extremely invasive species.

Etymology
The genus Latin name ("campanula"), meaning  'small bell', refers to the bell-shape of the flower, while the specific name ("rapunculoides") refers to the similarity to Campanula rapunculus.

Description
The stem is simple, erect and lightly pubescent and the leaves are usually shortly hairy. The upper stem leaves are sessile, lanceolate, and shortly stalked.

The inflorescence consists of  nodding spikelike racemes with numerous drooping flowers. The bracts are quite different and smaller than the leaves. The corolla is bell-shaped, with five deep lobes slightly ciliate. The flowering period extends from June through September. The flowers are pollinated by insects (bees, flies, butterflies, etc.) (entomophily). The fruit is a capsule with five pores near the base, where the seeds are spread.

The plant seeds abundantly (each plant can produce 15,000 seeds), and while some roots come out when it is pulled, the horizontal stolons grow vertical storage tubers, which may not be anywhere near the surface portions of the plant. These storage tubers can regrow stolons, which in turn send up shoots at some distance from the storage tubers. 
 
This plant has its overwintering buds situated just below the soil surface (hemicryptophyte). It spreads by underground rhizomes and produces deep, taproot-shaped tubers. Both are white and fleshy. Because any piece of the roots can sprout into a new plant, it is extremely hard to eradicate.

Distribution
This plant is native to Europe and western Siberia, where it grows in semi-shaded areas like open woods, the edges of denser forests, and meadowland. It has been introduced to North America, where it has become an extremely invasive weed; it chokes out other plants, and eliminating it is nearly impossible due to its multiple propagation mechanisms.

Like many related Campanula species and more distant relatives, it is edible and was historically grown for food. The roots, shoots, and leaves are all edible. The roots can be eaten raw or cooked, and the upper parts are mild-flavoured; indeed rather bland, commonplace, and somewhat chewy-leaved; the basal leaves are often cooked as a pot herb, where they blend in with other leaves unnoticeably.

Habitat
It also occurs in cultivated fields as a weed.

Gallery

Invasive species

Campanula rapunculoides is native to parts of Eurasia, but is a widespread European import to North America, and it is invasive.

It is extremely difficult to remove. Mechanical removal, burning, and chemicals have varying success rates, but there is no sure method of removing the plants first try.

References

 Pignatti S. - Flora d'Italia – Edagricole – 1982, Vol. II, pag. 695

External links

Biolib
Plants.usda
Wildflowers of Ontario
Ontario Weeds: Creeping bellflower, Ontario Ministry of Agriculture
Missouri Plants
Kew Plant List
IPNI Listing

rapunculoides
Plants described in 1753
Taxa named by Carl Linnaeus
Flora of Michigan
Flora of New York (state)
Flora without expected TNC conservation status
Edible plants
Flora of Europe
Flora invasive in North America